The North American Regional Broadcasting Agreement (NARBA) refers to a series of international treaties that defined technical standards for AM band (mediumwave) radio stations. These agreements also addressed how frequency assignments were distributed among the signatories, with a special emphasis on high-powered clear channel allocations.

The initial NARBA bandplan, also known as the "Havana Treaty", was signed by the United States, Canada, Mexico, Cuba, the Dominican Republic, and Haiti on December 13, 1937, and took effect March 29, 1941. A series of modifications and adjustments followed, also under the NARBA name. NARBA's provisions were largely supplanted in 1983, with the adoption of the Regional Agreement for the Medium Frequency Broadcasting Service in Region 2 (Rio Agreement), which covered the entire Western hemisphere. However, current AM band assignments in North America largely reflect the standards first established by the NARBA agreements.

Background

Organized AM (mediumwave) radio broadcasting began in the early 1920s, and the United States soon dominated the North American airwaves, with more than 500 stations by the end of 1922. Due to a change in the ionosphere after the sun sets, nighttime signals from AM band stations are reflected for distances extending for hundreds of kilometers. This is valuable in providing radio programming to sparsely settled areas using high-powered transmitters. However, it also leads to the need for international cooperation in station assignments, to avoid mutually interfering signals.

In an effort to rationalize assignments, a major reallocation went into force in the U.S. on November 11, 1928, following the standards set by the Federal Radio Commission's (FRC) General Order 40. At that time, the AM band was defined as 96 frequencies, running in 10 kilocycle-per-second (kHz) steps from 550 to 1500 kHz, which were divided into what became known as "Local", "Regional", and "Clear Channel" frequencies. The only provision the FRC made addressing international concerns was that six frequencies — 690, 730, 840, 910, 960, and 1030 — were designated for exclusive Canadian use. On May 5, 1932, through an exchange of letters, the U.S. and Canada informally endorsed and expanded the 1928 standards, including recognition of Canadian use of 540 kHz. During the 1930s, Canada also began using 1510 kHz, while in 1934 the U.S. authorized two experimental high-fidelity stations on each of 1530 and 1550 kHz. By 1939, Cuban stations existed on frequencies as high as 1600 kHz.

As other countries, especially Mexico and Cuba, developed their own radio broadcasting services, the need arose to standardize engineering practices, reduce interference, and more fairly distribute clear channel assignments. Moreover, the development of better frequency control, and especially directional antennas, made it possible for additional stations to operate on the same or close by frequencies without significantly increasing interference. A key objective for the United States was that, in exchange for receiving clear channel assignments, Mexico would eliminate the high-powered English-language "border blaster" stations that had been directing their programming toward the U.S. and causing significant interference to U.S. and Canadian stations. However, an initial international meeting held in Mexico City in the summer of 1933 failed, primarily due to a lack of agreement over how many clear channel frequencies would be assigned to Mexico.

1937 "Havana Treaty"

In 1937, a series of radio conferences, this time successful, was held in Havana, Cuba, and the initial NARBA agreement was signed on December 13, 1937 by representatives from the United States, Canada, Cuba, Mexico, the Dominican Republic and Haiti. The most significant change was the formal addition of ten broadcasting frequencies, from 1510 to 1600 kHz, with the 106 available frequencies divided into Clear Channel (59 frequencies), Regional (41) and Local (6) designations. The official lower limit remained at 550 kHz, as it was not possible to add stations at the bottom of the broadcast band due to the need to protect 500 kHz — a maritime international distress frequency — from interference. (Although operation on 540 kHz was not covered by the Agreement, unofficially it became an additional Canadian clear channel frequency.)

Under the Agreement, most existing stations operating on 740 kHz or higher would have to change frequencies. Open frequencies were created throughout the band by "stretching out" the existing assignments, achieved by following a table which in most cases moved all the stations on a common frequency to a new, higher, dial position. This provided gaps of unassigned frequencies, most of which became clear channels allocated to Mexico and Canada. A majority of the frequency shifts were limited to between 10 and 30 kHz, which conserved the electrical height of a station's existing vertical radiator towers, an important factor for readjusting directional antenna parameters to accommodate the new frequency.

Individual stations were specified to be Class I, II III or IV, with the class determining the maximum power a station could use and its interference protection standards. In all of the participating countries Class I and II stations were exclusively assigned to Clear Channel frequencies, while Class III was synonymous with a Regional frequency assignment. In the United States, Class IV stations were only assigned to Local frequencies, although in other countries they were assigned to both Local and Regional ones. A major change was the provision that some clear channels were allocated to be used simultaneously by two stations — those maintaining sole use of a frequency were classified as Class I-A, while stations sharing a clear channel were known as Class I-B. The Agreement assigned six Class I-A frequencies each to Mexico and Canada, and one to Cuba.

Reflecting the existence of improved radio design, the Agreement also reduced the "same market" minimum frequency separation from 50 to 40 kHz. (Mexico elected to further adopt a 30 kHz "same market" spacing, unless this was in conflict with an adjoining nation's "border zone" allocations.) This closer spacing was particularly important in the case of the two highest Local frequencies, 1420 and 1500 kHz, as stations on these frequencies were being moved to 1450 and 1490 kHz, a 40 kHz separation.

According to the Agreement's provisions, its implementation was to take place within one year after its adoption by the pact's four main signatories — the United States, Canada, Cuba and Mexico. Cuba was the first to ratify, on December 22, 1937, and was followed by the U.S. on June 15, 1938 and Canada on November 29, 1938. While waiting on Mexico, in 1939 the U.S. and Canada completed a frequency agreement based on the treaty standards. Mexico finally approved the treaty on December 29, 1939, and work commenced on adopting its wide-ranging provisions.

March 29, 1941 implementation

An engineering conference, with representatives from the U.S., Canada, Cuba, the Dominican Republic and Mexico, was held from January 14–30, 1941 in Washington, D.C., in order to coordinate the upcoming changes. With a few exceptions the frequency shifts were scheduled to be implemented at 0800 Greenwich Mean Time (3 a.m. E.S.T.) on March 29, 1941, which was informally known as "moving day". (Philadelphia stations petitioned mayor Robert Lamberton to declare a "Radio Moving Day", but he refused on the grounds that "My experience has been that proclamations by the mayor mean just exactly nothing and I issue as few as I can.")

The frequency changes affected "about a thousand stations in seven countries". The following chart reviews the assignments before and after March 29, 1941, including information about individual U.S. and Canadian stations, and summarizes the most significant changes:

Refinements

A series of modifications would follow the initial treaty, which was scheduled to expire on March 29, 1946. In early 1946, a three-year interim agreement gave Cuba expanded allocations, including the right to share five U.S., three Canadian, and two Mexican clear channel allocations, plus operate high-powered stations on some regional frequencies. The changes also resulted in the Bahamas being granted use of the 1540 kHz Clear Channel by the U.S.

The interim agreement expired on March 29, 1949, and there was great difficulty in agreeing on a replacement, in particular due to Mexican objections, which led to two failed conferences. A new NARBA agreement, to be effective for five years after ratification, was finally signed at Washington, D.C. on November 15, 1950, for the Bahamas, Canada, Cuba, the Dominican Republic, Jamaica and the United States. Mexico, which had withdrawn from the conference, and Haiti, which did not participate, were to be given a chance to subscribe. (The United States and Mexico made a bilateral agreement in 1957.) This agreement formally added 540 kHz as a Clear Channel frequency, and also provided for Cuba to share six, and Jamaica two, of the U.S. clear channel allocations. Some provisions remained controversial, and this version of the treaty wasn't ratified by the United States until early 1960. In 1980, Cuba gave the required one year notification that it was withdrawing from the NARBA treaty.

1981 "Rio Agreement"

The NARBA treaties have been substantially superseded by the "Regional Agreement for the Medium Frequency Broadcasting Service in Region 2" (Rio Agreement), which covers the entire Western hemisphere, and was signed at Rio de Janeiro, Brazil in 1981, taking effect on July 1, 1983 at 08:00 UTC. The interference protection criteria in the Rio Agreement are significantly different from NARBA's, and the concept of clear channel stations is eliminated. In adopting this agreement, the Bahamas and Canada declared their intent to renounce their adherence to NARBA. However, much of the structure introduced by that treaty remained intact.

Additional actions

On June 8, 1988 another conference held at Rio de Janeiro, this time under the auspices of the International Telecommunication Union, adopted provisions effective July 1, 1990 to add ten AM band frequencies within Region 2, commonly known as the "expanded band", and running from 1610 kHz to 1700 kHz.

The 1950 NARBA provisions are still in effect for the Bahamas, the Dominican Republic, and United States because those countries have not formally abrogated NARBA. The United States also has active bilateral agreements with Canada ("Agreement Between the Government of the United States of America and the Government of Canada Relating to the AM Broadcasting Service in the Medium Frequency Band" (1984) and Mexico ("Agreement Between the Government of the United States of America and the Government of the United Mexican States Relating to the AM Broadcasting Service in the Medium Frequency Band" (1986)).

See also 
 Canadian allocations changes under NARBA
 Clear-channel station — Includes a list of current North American clear-channel stations
 Geneva Frequency Plan of 1975 — Similar agreement covering the rest of the world

External links 
 Arrangement between the United States of America, Canada, Cuba, the Dominican Republic, Haiti, and Mexico, comprising recommendations of the North American Regional Radio-Engineering Meeting (supplemental to North American Regional Broadcasting Agreement, Habana, 1937). Signed at Washington January 30, 1941; effective March 29, 1941.
      • Agreement text (pages 1398–1400)
      • Canadian station assignments by frequency (pages 1408–1410)
      • Cuban station assignments by frequency (pages 1411–1414)
      • Dominican Republic station assignments by frequency (page 1414)
      • Haitian station assignments by frequency (page 1415)
      • Mexican station assignments by frequency (pages 1415–1420)
      • United States station assignments by frequency (pages 1421–1443)

 "AM Station Classes, and Clear, Regional, and Local Channels" FCC provided information about AM station classes (fcc.gov)
 "Big USA, Mexico, and Canadian AM Radio Stations" Additional information about Clear, Regional and Local AM frequencies in Canada, Mexico and the U.S. (ac6v.com)
 "Building the Broadcast Band" by Thomas H. White. Early development of the 520–1700 kHz Medium wave (AM) band (earlyradiohistory.us)
 "Behind the Clear-Channel Matter" by Mark Durenberger. Historical information about clear-channel AM radio stations (oldradio.com)

References 

Treaties entered into force in 1941
1941 in radio
1941 in Canada
1941 in Mexico
1941 in the United States
Radio in the United States
Bandplans
Mass media in Bermuda
Radio in Haiti
History of radio
Mass media regulation in Canada
Radio in Canada
Radio in the Caribbean
Law in the Caribbean
Law in North America
Radio in Mexico
Radio stations in Canada
Radio stations in the Caribbean
Radio stations in the Dominican Republic
Telecommunications treaties
United States communications regulation
Treaties of the United States
Treaties of Canada
Treaties of Mexico
Treaties of Haiti
Treaties of the Dominican Republic
Treaties of Cuba
1940s in Cuba